WRFW (88.7 FM) is a Class A radio station licensed to the UW System Board of Regents and operates in River Falls, Wisconsin, United States, the station serves the Minneapolis-St. Paul metropolitan area. WRFW is an affiliate of Wisconsin Public Radio (WPR), and airs news and talk programming from WPR's "Ideas Network".  The station also broadcasts local news, sports information, and entertainment programming. The broadcast studios are located in North Hall on the University of Wisconsin-River Falls campus.

See also Wisconsin Public Radio

External links
Wisconsin Public Radio

RFW
Wisconsin Public Radio
NPR member stations
University of Wisconsin–River Falls